Sinews of Steel is a 1927 American silent drama film directed by Frank O'Connor and starring Alberta Vaughn, Gaston Glass and Anders Randolf.

Cast
 Alberta Vaughn as Helen Blake 
 Gaston Glass as Robert McNeil Jr. 
 Anders Randolf as Robert McNeil Sr. 
 Paul Weigel as Jan Van Der Vetter 
 Greta von Rue as Elsie Graham
 Nora Hayden as Martha Jenkins 
 Charles Wellesley as Douglas Graham 
 John H. Gardener as Elmer Price
 Robert Gordon as The Office Boy

References

Bibliography
 Munden, Kenneth White. The American Film Institute Catalog of Motion Pictures Produced in the United States, Part 1. University of California Press, 1997.

External links
 

1927 films
1927 drama films
1920s English-language films
American silent feature films
Silent American drama films
Films directed by Frank O'Connor
American black-and-white films
Gotham Pictures films
1920s American films